Estella Meheux (born 22 June 1962) is a Sierra Leonean sprinter. She competed in the women's 100 metres at the 1980 Summer Olympics.

References

1962 births
Living people
Athletes (track and field) at the 1980 Summer Olympics
Sierra Leonean female sprinters
Sierra Leonean female hurdlers
Olympic athletes of Sierra Leone
Place of birth missing (living people)